Non abbiamo bisogno (Italian for "We do not need") is a Roman Catholic encyclical published on 29 June 1931 by Pope Pius XI.

Context 
The encyclical condemned what it perceived as Italian fascism's “pagan worship of the State” (statolatry) and “revolution which snatches the young from the Church and from Jesus Christ, and which inculcates in its own young people hatred, violence and irreverence.”

The encyclical begins with the Pope's protest against Mussolini's closing of Italian Catholic Action and Catholic Youth organizations in that same year.  Pius XI made protests not just about the closing of these Catholic associations, but also against false and defamatory reports ordered to be published in the Italian press by Mussolini. Pius also wrote that Mussolini's regime was anti-Catholic.

Cardinal Tarcisio Bertone, Cardinal Secretary of State under Popes Benedict XVI and Francis, asserts that the encyclical was "strongly polemic" against Mussolini who ordered that Catholic youth associations be dissolved.

See also
 Mit brennender Sorge, another encyclical written in the vernacular addressing fascism

References

External links
 Non abbiamo bisogno, Complete English text, on Vatican.va

Encyclicals of Pope Pius XI
1931 documents
1931 in Christianity
Anti-fascist works
June 1931 events
History of Catholicism in Italy